Siping-siping, simping-simping, or sisimping, is a type of armor used in Java. It is a short sleeveless jacket made of scale-shaped metal plates.

Description 
Unlike the kawaca which was only worn by high-ranking warriors, this battle outfit was mostly worn by infantry soldiers. It is usually defined as scale armor, Suryo Supomo interprets it as a metal plated jacket. Those who proved themselves in battle mentioned in the Nawanatya (a court etiquette manual composed in the 14th century) had jackets "decorated with shell discs". Several Javanese text indicated that some are made of brass.

At first the word siping-siping referred to a type of sea shell and its shell. It first appeared in the Kadiri (1042–1222) texts. In Modern Javanese, the word simping still refers to a kind of oyster shell. According to the Great Indonesian Dictionary, simping is "a scallop whose shell is round, flat and thin, one shell is red and more convex than the other shell which is white" or Amusium pleuronectes.

The Pitt River Museum has a Javanese scale armor made of horns. It is sleeveless and designed to resemble pangolin scales.

See also 

 Baju rantai
 Baju lamina
 Baju empurau
 Baru Oroba
 Baru lema'a
 Karambalangan
 Kawaca

References 

Indonesian inventions
Asian armour
Body armor
Military equipment of antiquity
Military equipment of Indonesia